Marco Follini (real name Giuseppe Follini, born 26 September 1954) is an Italian politician and journalist.

Follini was born in Rome. He was National Secretary of the Union of Christian and Centre Democrats until 15 October 2005.  He was also Vice-Prime Minister of Berlusconi's second government, taking office up to April 2005.

A former member of the Christian Democracy party, then he joined the Christian Democratic Centre and subsequently the UDC, becoming the national party leader in 2002, after the election of Pierferdinando Casini as President of the Chamber of Deputies. He unexpectedly resigned from his UDC leader position on 15 October 2005, following the approval of a new proportional electoral law by the ruling coalition the House of Freedoms, stating this was not the electoral law he actually wished.

Elected in the 2006 general election as Senator, he, along with Bruno Tabacci continued to show his disagreement of Berlusconi's leadership in the House of Freedoms. Follini also clashed with the rest of his party on several occasions, supporting, again with Bruno Tabacci's support, Giorgio Napolitano's candidacy in the presidential election and successfully campaigning in opposition to the constitutional reform approved by the House of Freedoms in 2005, then cancelled by a referendum.

On 18 October 2006 Follini officially left UDC and announced the foundation of a new centrist movement, called Middle Italy.  On 24 February 2007, after President Giorgio Napolitano sent the resigning Prodi cabinet to the Senate for a confidence vote, Marco Follini announced he would vote in favour of it.

On 22 May 2007 he was appointed a member of the organizing committee of the embryonic centre-left Democratic Party.

References

External links 
 Personal site

1954 births
Living people
Politicians from Rome
Christian Democracy (Italy) politicians
Christian Democratic Centre politicians
Union of the Centre (2002) politicians
Democratic Party (Italy) politicians
Deputy Prime Ministers of Italy
Deputies of Legislature XIII of Italy
Deputies of Legislature XIV of Italy
Senators of Legislature XV of Italy
Senators of Legislature XVI of Italy